Gabe may refer to:
A diminutive for Gabriel
Gabe Carimi, All American and NFL football left tackle
Gabe Cramer, American baseball pitcher
Gabe Kaplan, American actor and comedian
Gabe Kapler, American major league baseball outfielder and manager
Gabe Levin (born 1994), American-Israeli basketball player in the Israeli Basketball Premier League
Gabe Newell, managing director of Valve, often referred to as just Gabe or Gaben
Gabe Paul, American general manager and president for major league baseball teams
Gabe Saporta, former lead singer and bassist of Midtown, and current lead singer of Cobra Starship
Gabe York (born 1993), American basketball player for Hapoel Tel Aviv of the Israeli Basketball Premier League

Gabe may refer to the surname:
Dora Gabe, Bulgarian poet
Rhys Gabe, former Welsh rugby union player

Gabe may also refer to:
"Gabe", a song by Jason Collett from the 2002 album Motor Motel Love Songs

Fictional characters
A character in the book Locked in Time
A character in the movie Romper Stomper
A character in the video game Cliffhanger
A character in the film Get a Clue
A character in the film Thinner
A character in the TV series Gotham
A robot in the comic strip The 86ers
An angel in the webtoon Adventures of God
Gabe Logan, a protagonist in the Syphon Filter video game series
Johnathan Gabriel ("Gabe") in the comic strip Penny Arcade
Gabe Lewis, a Regional Director of Sales in The Office (U.S. TV series)
Gabe Duncan, a fictional character in the television show Good Luck Charlie
Gabe (formally named Gabriel), a character in the book The Giver and its film adaptation.

See also
 Gabe's
 Gabès
 Gabriel 

English masculine given names